Dialyceras is a genus of trees in the family Sphaerosepalaceae. The species are all endemic to Madagascar.

Species
The Plant List and Tropicos recognise 3 accepted species:
 Dialyceras coriaceum 
 Dialyceras discolor 
 Dialyceras parvifolium

References

Sphaerosepalaceae
Malvales genera
Taxa named by René Paul Raymond Capuron